Natividad (Spanish for "Nativity") may refer to:

 Natividad, California, USA
 Natividad, Pangasinan, Philippines
 General Mamerto Natividad, Nueva Ecija, Philippines
 Natividad, Oaxaca, Mexico
 Isla Natividad, a Pacific island west of Baja California Sur, Mexico
 Natividad, a fictional ship in the Horatio Hornblower novel The Happy Return by C. S. Forester
 Convento de la Natividad y San José, a former convent in Madrid